Gouadji Kao is a commune in the Cercle of Koutiala in the Sikasso Region of southern Mali. The commune covers an area of 150 square kilometers and includes 5 villages. In the 2009 census it had a population of 10,579. The village of N'Togonasso, the administrative centre (chef-lieu) of the commune, is 42 km northeast of Koutiala.

References

External links
.

Communes of Sikasso Region